Virginia Gungl (31 December 1848 – 28 August 1915) was a German soprano of Hungarian origin, prima donna on the stages in Munich and Frankfurt. Her voice spanned more than two octaves.

Career 
Daughter of the composer and conductor Joseph Gungl, she was born in New York where her father was on tour. She studied with the conductor and composer Hans von Bülow in Munich. In 1869, she made her debut at the Bayerische Staatsoper, then moved to Vienna for two more years of musical study.

She sang at the Theater Bremen (1880-1882), the Royal Theater Kassel (1883-1885) where she worked with Gustav Mahler from 1883 to 1885 and the Deutsches Nationaltheater Weimar (1885-1891). There, she bade farewell to the stage in 1892 as Isolde in Tristan und Isolde.

During her career she sang at the Bavarian Royal Opera in Munich (1875), the Leipzig Municipal Theater (1889), the Royal Theater in Karlsruhe (1873) and the Municipal Theater in Hannover (1877).

From Frankfurt, she moved to Weimar, where she later became singing teacher at the Hochschule für Musik Franz Liszt, Weimar.

Naumann-Gungl died in Frankfurt on 28 August 1915 at age 66.

Repertoire 
 Léonore in Fidelio
 Reiza in Oberon
 Donna Anna in Don Giovanni
 Rachel in La Juive 
 Countess Almaviva in The Marriage of Figaro
 Pamina in The Magic Flute 
 Aida 
 Carmen
 Isolde in Tristan und Isolde
 Sélika in L'Africaine 
 Senta in Der Fliegende Holländer.

References

Bibliography 
 Gran Enciclopèdia de la Música Clàsica, vol. II, Sarpe, 558 p.
 K. J. Kutsch and Leo Riemens, Großes Sängerlexikon, Vol 4, Munich, 1999.
  L.Fränkel, Virginia Naumann-Gungl, 1915.

External links 

 Naumann-Gungl (Gungl), Virginia on LMU
 Virginia Naumann-Gungl on operissimo.com

1848 births
1915 deaths
Singers from Berlin
19th-century German women opera singers
German operatic sopranos
German music educators
Women music educators
Voice teachers